Rafiq Uddin Sarkar is a Bangladesh Awami League politician and the former Member of Parliament of Rajshahi-17.

Career
Sarkar was elected to parliament from Rajshahi-17 as an Awami League candidate in 1973.

Death 
Sarkar died on 6 April 1981 at Zonal Bazar in Baraigram, Natore District, Bangladesh.

References

Awami League politicians
1st Jatiya Sangsad members
1981 deaths